The Whole Truth is the second album by Contemporary Christian group Point of Grace. It was released in 1995 by Word Records with selected market distribution by Epic Records.

Background and release 
The Whole Truth followed the group's debut album, which had produced six #1 singles. As a result, Word Records' promotion department felt intimidated by the prospect of its first single, "The Great Divide."

The lyrics of "The Great Divide," as recorded, were the result of a happy mistake: the line "There's a bridge to cross the great divide" was meant to be repeated, but a typo rendered the second instance as "There's a cross to bridge the great divide."

On December 9, 1995, the album charted on Billboards Top Christian Albums at #8 and on the Billboard 200 at No. 132. Each of the album's five singles, released between March 1995 and April 1996 reached #1 on the Christian songs chart, continuing what would become the group's historic run of 24 consecutive #1's on the chart.

Music videos were filmed for "Dying to Reach You" and "Gather at the River."

Track listing

 Personnel Point of Grace Shelley Breen – vocals
 Denise Jones – vocals
 Terry Jones – vocals
 Heather Payne – vocalsMusicians Pat Coil – acoustic piano (1, 4), synthesizer (4, 7, 10), Rhodes (7)
 David Hamilton – Hammond B3 organ (1, 7, 10), keyboards (3, 5, 8, 11), keyboard programming (3, 5), percussion programming (3, 5, 11), acoustic piano (9, 10)
 Dennis Patton – keyboards, synth bass and percussion programming (2, 6)
 Jerry McPherson – guitars (1)
 Tom Hemby – guitars (1, 2, 3, 5, 6, 9)
 Mark Baldwin – guitars (1, 3, 8, 11)
 Dann Huff – guitars (4, 7, 10)
 Jackie Street – bass (1, 3, 5, 8)
 Tommy Sims – bass (4, 7, 10, 11); keyboards, synth bass, drums and percussion programming (9)
 Scott Williamson – drums (1, 2, 5, 6)
 John Hammond – drums (3, 8), percussion programming (8)
 Paul Leim – drums (4, 7, 10)
 Eric Darken – percussion (4, 10, 11)
 Barry Green – trombone (5, 7)
 Chris McDonald – trombone (5, 7)
 Mike Haynes – trumpet (5, 7)
 George Tidwell – trumpet (5, 7)Arrangements'
 Robert Sterling – track arrangements (1, 4, 7, 8, 11), vocal arrangements (11)
 Scott Williamson – vocal arrangement (1, 2, 7, 8, 9)
 Dennis Patton – track arrangement (2, 6)
 David Hamilton – arrangements (3, 10), track arrangements (5)
 Cheryl Rogers – vocal arrangements (4, 5, 6)
 Geoff Thurman – track arrangements (4, 7), vocal arrangements (4, 7)
 Chris McDonald – horn arrangements (5, 7)
 Tommy Sims – track arrangements (9)
 Point of Grace – vocal arrangements (11)

Production 
 Producer – Robert Sterling 
 Executive Producer – John Mays
 Production Assistant – Holly Krig-Smith
 Tracks recorded by John Jaszcz and John Mayfield 
 Vocals and Overdubs recorded by Keith Compton, John Mayfield, Doug Sarrett, Glen Spinner and Scott Williamson.
 Recording Assistants – Shawn McLean, Greg Parker, Aaron Swihart and Glen Spinner.
 Recorded at The Bennett House (Franklin, TN); Uno Mas Studios (Brentwood, TN); Quad Studios and OmniSound Studios (Nashville, TN).
 Mixed by John Jaszcz at The Castle Recording Studios (Franklin, TN), assisted by John Hurley.
 Edited by John Mayfield at John Mayfield Sound Engineering, Inc.
 Mastered by Steve Hall at Future Disc (Hollywood, CA).
 Art Direction – Diana Barnes
 Design – The Kuester Group
 Photography – Michael Haber

References

Point of Grace albums
1995 albums